Sentinel Peak, is a  isolated, prominent limestone peak, west of the Continental Divide in British Columbia, Canada. It is highest summit in Misinchinka Ranges, a subdivision range of the Hart Ranges within the Northern Rocky Mountains.

Nearby
 Mount Ovington
 Mount Crysdale
 Limestone Peak
 Mount Barton  

References

Two-thousanders of British Columbia
Canadian Rockies
Cariboo Land District